In number theory and combinatorics, a multipartition of a positive integer n is a way of writing n as a sum, each element of which is in turn a partition.  The concept is also found in the theory of Lie algebras.

r-component multipartitions
An r-component multipartition of an integer n is an r-tuple of partitions λ(1),...,λ(r) where each λ(i) is a partition of some ai and the  ai sum to n.  The number of r-component multipartitions of n is denoted Pr(n).  Congruences for the function Pr(n) have been studied by A. O. L. Atkin.

References
 
 

Number theory
Combinatorics